The Defence and Overseas Secretariat is a secretariat in the United Kingdom Cabinet Office.

Heads of the Secretariat

 1994–1996: Paul Lever
 1996–1997: Colin Budd

See also
 Economic and Domestic Affairs Secretariat
 European Secretariat
 Civil Contingencies Secretariat

References

Cabinet Office (United Kingdom)